The 2015 KNVB Cup Final was a football match between PEC Zwolle and FC Groningen on 3 May 2015 at De Kuip, Rotterdam. It was the final match of the 2014–15 KNVB Cup competition and the 97th Dutch Cup Final. Groningen beat Zwolle 2–0 to win their first ever domestic cup.

Slovak winger Albert Rusnák was Groningen's hero of the day as he scored both goals for them.

Route to the final

Match

Details

References

2015
2014–15 in Dutch football
PEC Zwolle matches
FC Groningen matches
April 2015 sports events in Europe
Sports competitions in Rotterdam
21st century in Rotterdam